The 2014–15 CD Tenerife season is the 102nd season in the club's history.

Season overview

July

August

September

October

November

December

January

February

March

April

May

June

Current squad
As of 20 August 2014.

Squad information

Transfers in

In:

Out:

Friendlies

Competitions

Overall

Liga Adelante

Matches

Kickoff times are in CET and CEST

Results by round

Results summary

League table

Copa del Rey

Statistics

Top Scorer

Minutes played

Booking

References

Tenerife
CD Tenerife seasons